Zinatovka (Zinnät) is a rural locality (a village) in Karaidelsky Selsoviet, Karaidelsky District, Bashkortostan, Russia. The population was 2 as of 2010. There is 1 street.

Geography 
Zinatovka is located 10 km northwest of Karaidel (the district's administrative centre) by road. Starye Bagazy is the nearest rural locality.

References 

Rural localities in Karaidelsky District